Dushenko is a Ukrainian surname. Notable people with the surname include:

Chrisi Karvonides-Dushenko, American costume designer
Konstantin Dushenko (born 1946), Russian translator, culturologist, and historian

See also
 

Ukrainian-language surnames